Admontite is a hydrated magnesium borate mineral with formula MgB6O10·7H2O.  

Occurrence -  In a gypsum deposit.
Associations: gypsum, anhydrite, hexahydrite, löweite, eugsterite, pyrite, quartz.

It is named after Admont, Austria.  Its Mohs scale rating is 2 to 3.

See also
 List of minerals

References

Magnesium minerals
Nesoborates
Monoclinic minerals
Minerals in space group 14